Table tennis men's singles at the 2018 Commonwealth Games was held at the Oxenford Studios on the Gold Coast, Australia from 10 to 15 April.

Main draw

Finals

Top half

Section 1

Section 2

Bottom half

Section 3

Section 4

Preliminary stage

Group 1

Group 2

Group 3

Group 4

Group 5

Group 6

Group 7

Group 8

Group 9

Group 10

Group 11

Group 12

Group 13

Group 14

Group 15

Group 16

Group 17

Group 18

Group 19

Group 20

References

Men's singles